Hassi Woh Phassi, is a comedy serial which aired on Sab TV in 2003. Produced by Sri Adhikari Brother. The series is about a dentist played by Aasif Sheikh, who can read the mind/thoughts of any woman when she smiles.

Plot
A dentist played by Aasif Sheikh, who can read the mind/thoughts of any woman when she smiles.  He is a charming and knows how to woo all the women that come to his office for dental treatment.  He dreams to be with all sorts of pretty women, but is extremely scared of committing to any one woman.  Every other man seems jealous of him. The comedy lies in his friend trying to imitate him and failing badly every time.

Cast
Aasif Sheikh 
Shruti Ulfat
Seema Kapoor
Suresh Menon

External links
Official Site 

Sony SAB original programming
Indian comedy television series
Indian television sitcoms